Arçabil Hotel (former President Hotel) is a five star hotel located in the Ashgabat, Turkmenistan, along the Archabil Freeway on 18 km far from Ashgabat Airport and 12 km far from Ashgabat Railway Station.
 Ultra modern President Hotel was built in 2004 in the south part of the capital, 10 km from the center of the city. Hotel is located in the beautiful park zone. The building of the Hotel is buried in verdure. There are two cascades of the fountains around Hotel, pool with the beach, two tennis courts and guarded parking.

Arçabil Hotel is meant first of all for native and foreign delegations, but is always ready to accept Turkmenistan residents and foreign guests, traveling by themselves. The hotel consists of 152 rooms.

Hotel offers also conference halls for 120 places, banquet hall for 250 places, lobby-bar, fitness-club, pool, sauna, VIP-restaurant for 102 places.

History 
The President Hotel was renamed into the Archabil Hotel in May 2014.

References

External links
 Archabil Hotel Official web-site

2004 establishments in Turkmenistan
Hotels in Ashgabat
Skyscrapers in Turkmenistan
Skyscraper hotels
Hotels established in 2004
Hotel buildings completed in 2004